Sulcommata is a genus of beetles in the family Cerambycidae, containing the following species:

 Sulcommata durantoni Penaherrera-Leiva & Tavakilian, 2003
 Sulcommata ruficollis Tavakilian & Penaherrera-Leiva, 2003

References

Rhinotragini